Totem Bight State Historical Park is a  state park in the U.S. state of Alaska. It is located north of Ketchikan.

Description and history
The park is located on the former site of a traditional Native campground known as Mud Village and Mud Bight Village.  It contains a collection of totem poles and a replica of a traditional chieftain's house.  This wood-frame structure has a low oval entrance, leading into a square chamber with a central fire pit, decorated with carved "house posts". A stylized raven adorns the main facade.  The carvings on the house were executed by Charles Brown, a Native from Saxman.

The United States Forest Service used Civilian Conservation Corps (CCC) funds to hire skilled carvers from among the older Native Alaskans to repair or duplicate totem poles that were abandoned when the natives moved to communities where work was available. The CCC project built the community house and placed 15 totem poles, most of them replicas of 19th-century poles.  At statehood in 1959, title to the land passed from the federal government to the State of Alaska.

The historic site, comprising  of the park, was added to the National Register of Historic Places on October 27, 1970.

See also
List of Alaska state parks
National Register of Historic Places listings in Ketchikan Gateway Borough, Alaska

References

External links 
Division of Parks and Outdoor Recreation - Totem Bight State Historical Park
Totem Bight State Historical Park at The Living New Deal Project

State parks of Alaska
Protected areas of Ketchikan Gateway Borough, Alaska
Buildings and structures in Ketchikan Gateway Borough, Alaska
Totem poles in the United States
Buildings and structures on the National Register of Historic Places in Alaska
Civilian Conservation Corps in Alaska
National Register of Historic Places in Ketchikan Gateway Borough, Alaska